The Shannons of Broadway is a 1929 American comedy film directed by Emmett J. Flynn and starring James Gleason, Lucile Gleason and Mary Philbin. It was based on James Gleason's 1927 play of the same title, which was later remade as Goodbye Broadway.

Cast
 James Gleason as Mickey Shannon  
 Lucile Gleason as Emma Shannon  
 Mary Philbin as Tessie Swanzey  
 John Breeden as Chuck  
 Tom Santschi as Bradford  
 Harry Tyler as Eddie Allen  
 Gladys Crolius as Alice Allen  
 Helen Mehrmann as Minerva  
 Robert T. Haines as Albee  
 Slim Summerville as Newt  
 Tom Kennedy as Burt 
 Walter Brennan as Hez  
 Charley Grapewin as Swanzey

References

Bibliography
 Goble, Alan. The Complete Index to Literary Sources in Film. Walter de Gruyter, 1999.

External links
 

1929 films
1929 comedy films
1920s English-language films
Silent American comedy films
Films directed by Emmett J. Flynn
American black-and-white films
Universal Pictures films
1920s American films